Captain Arthur Haggerty (December 3, 1931 – July 3, 2006), was an American actor and self-described pioneer in the field of dog training.

Biography
Born in The Bronx on December 3, 1931, it is said that Captain Haggerty made dog training the respected profession it is today.  Raised in the Bronx while other children played stick ball, he begged his parents to take him to dog shows. He had an affinity to Boxers, Doberman Pinschers and German Shepherds.  He wanted to become a show dog handler.

During his three combat tours in Korea, he served as the Captain of the K9 Corps.  His illustrious record as a Ranger in the United States Army included a Congressional Commendation and a Bronze Star. After returning from Korea, in 1961 or 1962, he opened Tri State School for Dogs then eventually renamed it Captain Haggerty's School for Dogs. His school grew into the largest dog training school on the east coast and had a celebrity clientele that included: Liza Minnelli, Walt Frazier, Flip Wilson, Terry Shields, Leona Helmsley among others.

In the early 1970s he began supplying dogs for film, television and Broadway. In the Burt Reynolds' movie Shamus, not only did they use his dogs for many scenes, the producer loved his look and put him in front of the camera. He became known as Mr. Clean with his bald head and blue eyes.  Some of his movie credits include: Married to the Mob, Honeymoon in Vegas, The Last Dragon and a memorably gruesome appearance in the opening scenes of director Lucio Fulci's horror classic Zombi 2 as a rotting, shambling zombie that attacks a coast guard officer on a derelict boat. His television credits include guest appearances on various talk show such as The Tonight Show with Johnny Carson, The Morton Downey Jr. Show and David Letterman where he and his dog students appeared 26 times pioneering Stupid Pet Tricks.

According to Haggerty, his dual profession of being a character actor and dog trainer caused some confusion among his dog school clients and his friends in the film industry. When he would show up on a film set with or without dogs to train and act with them in front of the camera, people and fellow actors would recognize him and would say to him: "Oh, I didn't know you were an actor. I thought you trained dogs". At his dog training school, clients would recognize him from his film and TV commercial appearances and say to him: "Oh, I didn't know you trained dogs. I thought you were an actor." Since he was known as 'Captain Haggerty' at his dog school, and then known as Arthur Haggerty on film sets, he decided to legally change his name to Captain Haggerty in order to combine both of his professions so that people would know who he really was on and off camera.

He wrote hundreds of articles on dogs and won several writing awards including the illustrious Howell Award given by the Dog Writer's Association of America.  His three books include: Dog Tricks, How to Get Your Pet Into Show Business and How to Teach Your Dog to Talk.  He also wrote and published the Aggression Newsletter from 1997 to 2006.

An encyclopedia of dog knowledge, he was generous with his time and was unapologetically honest.  He was called "politically incorrect" by Steve Dale who wrote an article for Dog World called The Politically Incorrect Captain Haggerty.  Steve Dale asked him in that interview what he would like his epitaph to say, he responded that "He was an annoying and grating individual. But he loved dogs. He saved lives. He got the job done. End of story."

Death 
Captain Arthur Haggerty died at home in West Palm Beach, Florida from adenocarcinoma July 3, 2006 at age 74.  Leaving his only child, a daughter, Babette Haggerty to carry on the family legacy.  She is also a dog trainer, writer and mother.

References

External links

American male film actors
American male television actors
Dog trainers
1931 births
2006 deaths
20th-century American male actors